The Internationale Niedersachsen–Rundfahrt is a multi-stage road bicycle race held in Lower Saxony, Germany. It was first held in 1977 and since 2005 it has been organised as a 2.1 event on the UCI Europe Tour.

Winners

External links 

Official Website 

UCI Europe Tour races
Cycle races in Germany
Recurring sporting events established in 1977
1977 establishments in West Germany
Sport in Lower Saxony